The Brenner Pass (shortly) is a mountain pass through the Alps which forms the border between Italy and Austria. It is one of the principal passes of the Eastern Alpine range and has the lowest altitude among Alpine passes of the area.

Dairy cattle graze in alpine pastures throughout the summer in valleys beneath the pass and on the mountains above it. At lower altitudes, farmers log pine trees, plant crops and harvest hay for winter fodder.

The central section of the Brenner Pass covers a four-lane motorway and railway tracks connecting Bozen/Bolzano in the south and Innsbruck to the north. The village of Brenner consists of an outlet shopping centre (supermarkets and stores), fruit stores, restaurants, cafés, hotels and a gas station. It has a population of 400 to 600.

Etymology 
Older, obsolete theories suggested a connection of the name Brenner with the ancient tribe of the Breuni or the Gaulish chieftain Brennus, but since the pass name appears for the first time only in the 14th century, a more recent etymology is far more likely. Prenner was originally the name of a nearby farm, which itself was named after its former owner. The farm of a certain Prennerius is mentioned in documents in 1288, a certain Chunradus Prenner de Mittenwalde is mentioned in 1299. The German word Prenner probably refers to somebody who uses slash-and-burn techniques for land clearing. A name for the pass itself appears for the first time in 1328 as ob dem Prenner (German for above the Prenner).

History

Roman Empire 

The Romans regularised the mountain pass at Brenner, which had already been under frequent use during the prehistoric eras since the most recent Ice Age. The Brenner Pass, however, was not the first trans-Alpine Roman road to become regularised under the Roman Empire.

The first Roman road to cross the Alpine range, Via Claudia Augusta, connected Verona in northern Italy with Augusta Vindelicorum (modern-day Augsburg) in the Roman province of Raetia. Via Augusta was completed in 46–47 AD; the route took its course along the Adige valley to the neighbouring Reschen Pass (west of the Brenner Pass), then descended into the Inn valley before rising to Fern Pass towards Augsburg.

The Roman road that physically crossed over the Brenner Pass did not exist until the 2nd century AD. It took the "eastern" route through the Puster Valley and descended into Veldidena (modern-day Wilten), where it crossed the Inn and into Zirl and arrived at Augsburg via Füssen.

The Alamanni (Germanic tribe) crossed the Brenner Pass southward into modern-day Italy in 268 AD, but they were stopped in November of that year at the Battle of Lake Benacus. The Romans kept control over the mountain pass until the end of their empire in the 5th century.

Holy Roman Empire 
During the High Middle Ages, Brenner Pass was a part of the important Via Imperii, an imperial road linking the Kingdom of Germany north of the Alps with the Italian March of Verona. In the carolingian Divisio Regnorum of 806 the Brenner region is called per alpes Noricas, the transit through the Noric Alps. Since the 12th century, the Brenner Pass was controlled by the Counts of Tyrol within the Holy Roman Empire. Emperor Frederick Barbarossa made frequent uses of the Brenner Pass to cross the Alps during his imperial expeditions into Italy. The 12th-century Brenner Pass was a trackway for mule trains and carts.

Modernisation of the Brenner Pass started in 1777, when a carriage road was laid out at the behest of Empress Maria Theresa.

Austrian Empire 
Modernisation further took place under the Austrian Empire and the Brenner Railway, which was completed in stages from 1853 to 1867. It became the first trans-Alpine railway without a major tunnel and at high altitude (crossing the Brenner Pass at 1,371 m). Completion of the railway enabled the Austrians to move their troops more efficiently; the Austrians had hoped to secure their territories of Venetia and Lombardy (south of the Alps), but lost them to Italy following the Second Italian War of Independence in 1859 and Austro-Prussian War in 1866.

Recent history 
At the end of World War I in 1918, the control of the Brenner Pass became shared between Italy and Austria under the Treaty of Saint-Germain-en-Laye (1919). The Treaty of London (1915) secretly awarded Italy the territories south of the Brenner Pass for supporting the Entente Powers. Welschtirol/Trentino, along with the southern part of County of Tyrol (now South Tyrol), was transferred to Italy, and Italian troops occupied Tyrol and arrived at the Brenner Pass in 1919 to 20.

During World War II, Adolf Hitler and Benito Mussolini met at the Brenner Pass to celebrate their Pact of Steel on 18 March 1940. The Brenner Pass was part of the ratlines that were used by some fleeing Nazis after the German surrender in 1945.

Motorway
The motorway E45 (European designation; in Italy A22, in Austria the A13), Brenner Autobahn/Autostrada del Brennero, begins in Innsbruck, runs through the Brenner Pass, Bozen/Bolzano, Verona and finishes outside Modena. It is one of the most important routes of north–south connections in Europe.

After the signing of the Schengen Agreement in 1992 and Austria's subsequent entry into the European Union in 1995, customs and immigration posts at the Brenner Pass were removed in 1997. However, Austria reinstituted border checks in 2015 as a response to the European migrant crisis. In April 2016, Austria announced it would build a 370-meter long fence at the Pass but clarify that "it would be used only to "channel" people and was not a barrier."

The Europabrücke (Europe Bridge), located roughly halfway between Innsbruck and the Brenner Pass, is a large concrete bridge carrying the six-lane Brenner Autobahn over the valley of Sill River (Wipptal). It is a site where bungee-jumping from the bridge has become a popular tourist attraction.

The ever-increasing freight and leisure traffic, however, has been causing long traffic jams at busy times even without border enforcements. The Brenner Pass is the only major mountain pass within the area; other nearby alternatives are footpaths across higher mountains at an altitude of above . As a result, air and noise pollution have generated heavy debate in regional and European politics. , about 1.8 million trucks crossed the Europa Bridge per year.

Railway
In order to ease the road traffic, there are plans to upgrade the Brenner Railway from Verona to Innsbruck with a series of tunnels, including the Brenner Base Tunnel underneath Brenner. While the official groundbreaking of the tunnel had taken place in 2006 (with survey tunnels drilled in the same year), substantial work did not begin until 2011. Funding issues have delayed the tunnel's scheduled date of completion from 2022 to no earlier than 2032.

See also
 List of highest paved roads in Europe
 List of mountain passes
 Principal passes of the Alps

References

External links 

 
 Webcam Brenner Pass

Austria–Italy border crossings
Mountain passes of South Tyrol
Mountain passes of the Alps
Mountain passes of Tyrol (state)
Rhaetian Alps